The 2016 Saudi Super Cup was the fourth edition of the Saudi Super Cup, an annual football match contested by the winners of the previous season's Saudi Pro League and King's Cup competitions.

The match was played between Al-Ahli the winners of both the 2015–16 Saudi Pro League and the 2016 King Cup, and Al-Hilal, the winners of the 2015–16 Crown Prince Cup. It was held at Craven Cottage in London, England on 8 August 2016. Al-Ahli won the match 4–3 on penalties following a 1–1 draw, winning their first Super Cup title.

Background
Al-Ahli qualified as champions of the 2015–16 Saudi Professional League and winners of the 2016 King Cup. It was their first Saudi Super Cup appearance since the competition was introduced in 2013.

Al-Hilal qualified as winners of the 2015–16 Crown Prince Cup. They defeated Al-Ahli 2–1 on 19 February 2016 to win their record breaking 13th title. It was their 2nd Super Cup appearance, and were looking to win their 2nd title. They were also the defending champions.

The previous match between the two sides was a 3–1 win for Al-Ahli at King Abdullah Sports City on 24 April 2016. Al-Hilal opened the scoring through Carlos Eduardo in the 10th minute before Omar Al Somah scored twice for Al-Ahli in the 2nd half, while Housain Al-Mogahwi sealed the victory by adding a third in the 93rd minute and completed a remarkable comeback to win the league title.

Match

Details

See also
 2016–17 Pro League
 2016–17 1st Division League
 2016–17 2nd Division League
 2017 King Cup
 2016–17 Crown Prince Cup

References

Saudi Super Cup
Super Cup
Al-Ahli Saudi FC matches
Al Hilal SFC matches
Saudi Super Cup 2016